Charoite  is a rare silicate mineral, first described in 1978. It was believed to be named after the Chara River, but due to the river being 70 km away from its discovery place, now it is believed to be named after the Russian word chary, meaning magic or charms. When it was discovered, it was thought to be a fake, dyed purple to give it its striking appearance.

Properties 
Charoite is translucent lavender to purple in color with a pearly luster.  Charoite is strictly massive in nature, and fractures are conchoidal. It has an unusual swirling, fibrous appearance, sometimes chatoyant, and that, along with its intense color, can lead many to believe at first that it is synthetic or enhanced artificially. Though reportedly discovered in the 1940s, it was not known to most of the world until its description in 1978. It is said to be opaque and unattractive when found in the field; a fact that may have contributed to its late recognition. Charoite consists of oxygen (43.75%), silicon (27.65%) and calcium (17.53%) mainly, but its composition includes potassium (10.69%) - which gives it its radioactive properties - and hydrogen (0.39%) as well. It has a barely detectable, 0.65% radioactivity concentration per Gamma Ray American Petroleum Institute Units.

Inclusions mainly come in the swirly patterns of the mineral. The black spots on some specimens are either augite or aegirine, the latter occurring in almost all charoites since they commonly grow together. Larger round greenish spots are feldspar. Lighter colored stones or ones with translucent areas are likely due to canasite. The yellowish brown spots are tinaksite, which was discovered at the same time as charoite was. Charoite's silky, fibrous structure results in a shimmery looking polished stone. Sometimes, the very white flashes are tiny white feldspar. Sugilites and charoites can be confused, as both are purple, and sugilite can have black and white inclusions, however sugilite lacks the swirling pattern that are present in charoite stones, and it also lacks the chatoyant effect.

Occurrences 
It has been reported only from the Aldan Shield, Sakha Republic, Siberia, Russia. It is found where a syenite of the Murun Massif has intruded into and altered limestone deposits producing a potassium feldspar metasomatite, and forms between 200 - 250 °C. Tinaksite, canasite and charoite are associated and black aegirine is also common where these three minerals grow. Common impurities include aluminium, iron, manganese, strontium and barium. Charoitite is a rock like lapis lazuli, but unlike the latter one, charoitite mostly consists of the mineral charoite.

Marketing and Uses 
When it arrived to the western market, it was already named charoite. Common tradenames include charoite jade and lilac stone. Although considering its rarity and only type locality, even the highest quality charoite gemstones cost only a few dollars a carat, usually costing between 1.10 - $3 per carat. In its price, color and chatoyancy are the main factors. Chatoyant translucent varieties are the most sought after, as while chatoyancy already being uncommon in the mineral, translucent varieties are rarer than the more common opaque ones. Amongside jewelry, due to the fact that the material can be massive in size, charoite can be used in the making of bookends, vases, goblets, boxes, or in small statues. Although its relatively high hardness, it makes poor center pieces in rings and in bracelets. As it is a heat sensitive mineral, the mechanical cleaning of it should be avoided. It is recommended to use mild detergents and soft brushes or a cloth to clean it, and to never use strong and toxic detergents on it.

Gallery

References

Calcium minerals
Sodium minerals
Potassium minerals
Inosilicates
Monoclinic minerals
Minerals in space group 11